The  was a doublet earthquake that took place on April 9, 1858 (according to the old Japanese calendar, February 26, Ansei 5). It most likely occurred on the Atotsugawa and Miboro faults, which connect the Amō Pass in Gifu Prefecture (in the part that was called Hida Province) and Mount Tate in Toyama Prefecture (then known as Etchū Province) on the island of Honshū in Japan. The earthquakes are estimated to have killed 200–300 people. It also caused the Mount Tonbiyama landslide and blocked the upper reaches of the Jōganji River.

See also
Ansei great earthquakes
List of earthquakes in Japan
List of historical earthquakes

References

External links
飛越地震（岐阜県防災局） (Hietsu jishin (Gifu-ken Bōsaikyoku)), Gifu Prefecture
飛越地震による大鳶山、小鳶山の大崩壊—災害伝承情報データベース (Hietsu jishin ni yoru Ōtonbi-yama, Kotonbi-yama no dai hōkai—Saigai denshō jōhō database), Ministry of Internal Affairs and Communications

1858 in Japan
1858 earthquakes
Landslides in Japan
Landslides in 1858
April 1858 events
Earthquakes of the Edo period
1858 disasters in Japan